James Richard William Purves (5 March 1903 – 13 May 1979) – generally denoted in publications as J. R. W. Purves  -- was an Australian lawyer and philatelist. His half century of work in Australian philately earned him the title "The personification of Australia in International Philately".

Philatelic literature
Purves authored philatelic literature based on his detailed studies of postage stamps. These included numerous books and articles:
 Art and the postage stamp : the present Australian outlook
 The Half Lengths of Victoria (1953)
 North-West Pacific Islands : The Nature And Make-Up of the Different Overprinting Formes (1953)
 South Australia - The Long Stamps of 1902–1912 (1978)
 Victoria: the Postage Dues
 Numerous articles on aspects of the stamps and postal history of Victoria

Collecting interests
The most significant of Purves' collections of postage material included collections of philatelic material on:
 Tasmania
 Fiji
 Half Lengths of Victoria

Philatelic activity
Purves was active in all fields of Australian philatelic interest. He helped establish the Royal Philatelic Society of Victoria in 1957. For his work with the society, and because of his extensive work in Australian philately, the society established the J.R.W. Purves Medal in 1970 is his honor and named him as the first recipient.

Honors and awards
For his work in the field of philately, Purves was provided numerous awards and honors, including:
 signed the Roll of Distinguished Philatelists in 1937
 The Crawford Medal in 1954
 The Lichtenstein Medal in 1960
 The J. R.W. Purves Medal in 1970
 Entered in the American Philatelic Society Hall of Fame in 1980.
 Honorary Life Member of the Collectors Club of New York
 Honorary Life Fellow of the Royal Philatelic Society London in 1969
 Honorary Life Fellow of the Royal Philatelic Society of Victoria

See also
 Philately
 Philatelic literature
 Lichtenstein Medal
 Crawford Medal

References and sources
References

Sources
 The Collectors Club of New York, Lichtenstein Award Winners
 Library catalog
 American Philatelic Society
 Australian Directory of Biography

External links
http://www.philatelicdatabase.com/australia-and-dependencies/mr-j-r-w-purves-rdp-frpsl/

1903 births
1979 deaths
Australian philatelists
Philately of Australia
University of Melbourne alumni
Signatories to the Roll of Distinguished Philatelists
Fellows of the Royal Philatelic Society London
20th-century Australian lawyers
American Philatelic Society